Luray Township is a township in Russell County, Kansas, United States. As of the 2010 United States Census, it had a population of 258.

History
Luray Township was organized from part of Fairview Township in 1906.

Geography
The center of Waldo Township is located at  (39.0500111, −98.6420168) at an elevation of 1,594 feet (486 m). The township lies in the Smoky Hills region of the Great Plains. The Saline River flows windingly southeast through the southwestern corner of the township where it drains into Wilson Lake. One of the river's tributaries, Wolf Creek, flows east and southeast through the northern part of the township, fed by two tributaries of its own, Coon Creek and Fourmile Creek, which flow south.

According to the United States Census Bureau, Luray Township occupies an area of 71.23 square miles (184.5 km2) of which 70.56 square miles (182.7 km2) is land and 0.67 square miles (1.7 km2) is water. Located in northeastern Russell County, it includes the city of Luray, which is located in the northwestern corner of the township, and it borders Osborne County's Jackson and Delhi Townships to the north, Fairview Township to the east, Plymouth Township to the southeast, Center Township to the south, and Waldo Township to the west.

Demographics

As of the 2010 census, there were 258 people, 121 households, and 80 families residing in the township. The population density was 3.6 people per square mile (1.4/km2). There were 175 housing units at an average density of 2.5 per square mile (1.0/km2). The racial makeup of the township was 97.7% White and 2.3% from two or more races. Hispanic or Latino of any race were 1.6% of the population.

There were 121 households, out of which 19.0% had children under the age of 18 living with them, 58.7% were married couples living together, 2.5% had a male householder with no wife present, 5.0% had a female householder with no husband present, and 33.9% were non-families. 30.6% of all households were made up of individuals, and 16.5% had someone living alone who was 65 years of age or older. The average household size was 2.13, and the average family size was 2.54.

In the township, the population was spread out, with 15.9% under the age of 18, 7.3% from 18 to 24, 18.3% from 25 to 44, 33.3% from 45 to 64, and 25.2% who were 65 years of age or older. The median age was 49.8 years. For every 100 females, there were 103.2 males. For every 100 females age 18 and over, there were 104.7 males age 18 and over.

Education
Luray Township lies within Unified School District (USD) 299, based in Sylvan Grove, Kansas.

Transportation
Kansas Highway 18 (K-18), an east–west route, enters the northern part of the township from the west, then turns southeast. U.S. Route 281, a north–south route, enters the township from the west concurrently with K-18, then turns north after one-half-mile and exits the county. A network of mostly unpaved county roads is laid out in a rough grid pattern across the township. Bunker Hill-Luray Road, a paved north–south county road, enters the township from the west four miles south of K-18, then turns north, terminating in the city of Luray.

References

Townships in Russell County, Kansas
Townships in Kansas